Hamburg High School can refer to:

Hamburg High School (Arkansas) - Hamburg, Arkansas
Hamburg High School (Hamburg, New York)